RSS Panglima (P68) was the first ship of the Republic of Singapore Navy. The ship was commissioned in 1956 as HMS Panglima and was the third ship to be given the name. She was regarded as a milestone for the Malayan shipbuilding industry. During her Royal Navy service, the ship hosted distinguished guests such as South Vietnamese vice president Nguyễn Ngọc Thơ and Singapore's first native head of state the Yang di-Pertuan Negara Yusof bin Ishak. She also embarked on numerous goodwill visits to nearby ports and conducted naval training for new sailors.

Upon Singapore's merger to form Malaysia, the ship was recommissioned as KD Panglima in September 1962. She engaged in several minor skirmishes with Indonesia during the Indonesia–Malaysia confrontation. Singapore's secession on 9 August 1965 led to the ship's recommissioning as RSS Panglima in January 1966.

The ship underwent a major refit prior to being transferred to Midshipman School in 1983 to serve exclusively as a training ship. In 1991, she was decommissioned and sold at auction, after having served in three navies across 35 years of active service. The Naval Military Experts Institute still bears her name today.

Name and predecessors
The word Panglima is derived from a Malay language title commonly translated as warrior or commander. HMS Panglima was the third in a series of ships to bear the name. Her first predecessor Panglima was a  motor launch built in 1937 which served as a training ship for officers and enlisted personnel. Assigned to the Malayan Royal Naval Volunteer Reserve (MRNVR) headquartered in Singapore, the first Panglima was later sunk in February 1942 while evacuating British and Australian troops during World War II.

A second Panglima  motor fishing vessel was launched in the United Kingdom on 5 September 1944, but upon its transfer to the MRNVR in 1948, proved unsuited for tropical waters and began deteriorating rapidly. It was decided to replace the ship entirely rather than refit her.

Construction
The keel laying for a new ship took place in 1954 at a United Engineers Ltd shipyard. In October 1955, it was announced that the new ship would be launched in December of that year. Construction progressed throughout 1955 and the ship was scheduled to be commissioned in March 1956, though this was delayed. The ship cost $1 million.

The ship launching ceremony for HMS Panglima took place at 11 am, 14 January 1956, at Tanjong Rhu Dockyard.  Royal Malayan Navy sailors formed a guard of honour welcoming Governor of Singapore Sir Robert Black and his wife Lady Anne Black. Religious leaders of Islam, Buddhism, Hinduism, Zoroastrianism and Christianity blessed the ship. Shortly afterward, Lady Black launched the ship in accordance with naval tradition by shattering a champagne bottle upon the bow, and Panglima slid into the waters to the fanfare of music. During the entire event, about 350 United Engineers workers who had built the ship protested outside the gates demanding for higher wages, though they did not disrupt the ceremony. Sea trials commenced in March and Panglima was commissioned in May.

Panglima'''s hull consisted of teak and hardwood from the Malayan and Thai rainforests, coupled with a steel and light alloy. The light alloy superstructure enabled greater ship stability and reduced the overall displacement of the vessel. As aluminum surfaces required less repainting than steel, the cost of maintenance was also reduced. Such innovations were already widely practiced in other countries but Panglima was nevertheless regarded as a milestone of the Malayan shipbuilding industry. Lieutenant Commander Fleming called the ship "comparable to the most modern craft of her type in the Royal Navy".

Operational career
Royal Navy service

In November 1956, Panglima escorted the Royal Yacht Britannia as the latter proceeded to Langkawi and Port Swettenham (today Port Klang). As Panglima had departed Singapore hastily to rendezvous the yacht, the crew had forgotten to restock supplies. The Duke of Edinburgh gifted the ships' company six cartons of matchsticks after an officer declined a cigarette during a cocktail party onboard Britannia.

Under the command of Lieutenant Commander J.S. Macintye, Panglima sailed to Penang on 12 January 1957 as part of a routine cruise. In April 1957, Panglima visited Saigon, the capital of South Vietnam as part of a goodwill visit. The visit coincided with Queen Elizabeth II's birthday; Panglima and other Republic of Vietnam Navy ships fired a 21-gun salute at noon in her honour on 23 April. The ship also hosted the South Vietnamese vice president Nguyễn Ngọc Thơ and Navy chief Lê Quang Mỹ. She returned to Singapore on 29 April.

As a training ship, Panglima embarked three recruits from the Women's Auxiliary Naval Service (SWANS) and 14 other ratings from the Malayan and Fijian royal naval reserves in April 1958.

On 22 February 1959, the Duke of Edinburgh Prince Philip, who was also Admiral of the Fleet, visited Singapore on an official royal tour. Panglima escorted his barge from the Royal Yacht Britannia as it made its way to Clifford Pier, with her crew lining the deck. The prince departed Singapore on 25 February and Panglima accompanied astern of Britannia back out to sea.Panglima participated in a mock battle with the Royal Navy submarine HMS Tactician in September 1960, with the former asserting a sea denial stance against its adversary seeking to enter Singapore waters. Tactician repeatedly evaded detection until sunset, when Panglima established contact and fired "depth charges" and "won" the battle. It was the first exercise the ship had conducted with a submarine, lasting three hours.

On 22 July 1961, Panglima hosted the Yang di-Pertuan Negara Yusof bin Ishak as he reviewed a naval parade put on by the Harbour Division of Singapore Customs. As Panglima sailed past the Customs fleet of speedboats and launches, they saluted the island's first native head of state by sounding their air horns.

Malaysian service
The State of Singapore merged with Malaya, North Borneo and Sarawak on 16 September 1963 to form Malaysia. On 22 September 1963, the Royal Navy officially handed over the Singapore division of the MRNVR to the Royal Malaysian Navy. HMS Panglima was recommissioned as KD Panglima (KD standing for Kapal Di-Raja, or "His Majesty's Ship"), and assigned to the Singapore Volunteer Force of the Royal Malaysian Navy.

With the ongoing Indonesia–Malaysia confrontation, Panglima was involved in patrolling the Singapore Strait against intrusions. On 1 April 1964, Panglima was on patrol duty off Pedra Branca when the survey ship HMS Dampier operating nearby rescued three Indonesian Chinese from their sinking sampan during a storm. Dampiers crew pumped the water out of the sampan to make it seaworthy again, and Panglima subsequently towed it back to Singapore. Under Lieutenant Andy Miller in 1965, she was involved with a minor skirmish with Indonesian custom boats and torpedo boats. Radioing the naval headquarters for assistance, the standoff lasted seven minutes until British and Australian aircraft arrived overhead with a British frigate, resulting in the Indonesians retreating.

Singaporean service

On 9 August 1965, Singapore separated from Malaysia to form a sovereign republic. KD Panglima was the first of three ships to be handed over to Singapore, and recommissioned as RSS Panglima (RSS standing for Republic of Singapore Ship) on 1 January 1966. On 1 February, the Singapore Volunteer Force was transferred to the republic's Ministry of the Interior and Defence.

Under the command of Lieutenant Roland Vivian Simon in 1967, Panglima came across a bumboat being shot at by an Indonesian customs boat, off the island of Pulau Sekang (today part of Pulau Semakau). Panglima opened fire on the custom boat's wheelhouse and radar, successfully forcing it to retreat.

With the fall of Saigon in 1975, Vietnamese boat people began entering Singapore waters. Under the command of Captain Ernest H Wickramsingh, Panglima was the first ship to encounter the arrivals and subsequently remained at sea for 23 days during Operation Thunderstorm, past her regular two to three day patrols. Her crew boarded the incoming refugee boats to repair defects and provide supplies.

Panglima became part of the Support Ship Squadron in August 1976. She subsequently underwent a major refit in November 1981 which included providing her bridge with air-conditioning by enclosing it, with the refit being completed in March 1982. The Midshipman School took over the ship in 1983 and thereafter used it exclusively as a training ship. During the 1990 National Day Parade, she participated in Singapore's first post-independence sea review.

Decommissioning

Panglima was the first RSN ship to be granted a formal decommissioning ceremony. On 9 July 1991, following 35 years of active service across three navies, Panglima was decommissioned in a ceremony officiated by Chief of Navy Commodore Teo Chee Hean held at Brani Naval Base. A minute of silence was observed one minute before sunset, upon which her flags and commissioning pennant were hauled down accompanied by the national anthem. Her final commanding officer, Captain Harry Wee handed the flags to the chief of navy.

Public opinion was split on whether to preserve Panglima, with some highlighting her historical value and others saying it was not worth the cost.

DBS Land considered purchasing and restoring Panglima as a maritime exhibit or entertainment ship as part of its revitalization plans for Clarke Quay. Its representatives toured the ship on 4 May, but the company eventually decided not to move forward with the plans in August.

Legacy
The ship's name was transferred to the School of Naval Training and later RSS Panglima-Changi Naval Training Base (CNTB). The CNTB was later renamed the Institute of Maritime Operations & Systems (IMOS) and subsequently the Naval Military Experts Institute (NMI) on 12 July 2013, though it's still referred to as RSS Panglima. 

The ship's bell, helms, and 40mm Bofors main gun are on display in the Navy museum within Changi Naval Base.

ReferencesPrimary sources cited'''
 

Ships of the Republic of Singapore Navy
1956 ships
Republic of Singapore Navy